The 2012 Challengers Cup is South Korea's league cup competition for the Challengers League clubs. 2012 edition was second season of Challengers Cup. The competition was begun on 28 July 2012, and ended on 4 August 2012.

Match Results

Bracket

First round

References

See also
 2012 Challengers League

Challengers Cup seasons
2012 domestic association football cups
2012 in South Korean sport